Charles Black Milne (1879–1960) was the Unionist Party MP for West Fife from 1931 to 1935.

Normally a safe Labour seat, he did well to win it in narrowly in the National Government landslide victory of 1931, but lost it to Willie Gallacher of the Communist Party in 1935.

External links 
  at leighrayment.com
 

1879 births
1960 deaths
Members of the Parliament of the United Kingdom for Scottish constituencies
UK MPs 1931–1935
Unionist Party (Scotland) MPs
Members of the Parliament of the United Kingdom for Fife constituencies